Calisto bradleyi is a butterfly of the family Nymphalidae. It is endemic to Cuba, where it is found in the major mountain range of western Cuba, Guaniguanico, from El Taburete, at Sierra del Rosario, west to Viñales valley, always at low elevations. The species inhabits various vegetation types throughout its distribution but can only be found in areas where original elements are still dominant.

The length of the forewings is 17–20 mm for males and 20–21 mm for females.

References

Calisto (butterfly)
Butterflies of Cuba
Endemic fauna of Cuba
Butterflies described in 1950